Chakesar (Sindhi: چاکسار, "chaksar") is a town / Tehsil of the Shangla District in Khyber-Pakhtunkhwa province of Pakistan. It is situated about 6 km in the north-west on the right bank of the Indus River. Chakesar was given the status of Tehsil in 2017, by the PTI Govt, in kp on request of PTI's former candidate for National assembly Mr. Nawaz Mehmood. The inhabitants live primarily on agricultural products.

Chakesar is on a formation of a river delta in a valley of 3 km wide by 5 km long at the elevation of 3722 feet above sea level. The village is on suture zone / collision zone between the Indian continent and Eurasian continent. This suture zone is world-famous for hosting precious stone deposits of emeralds, rubies etc. The collision was preceded by a magmatic event known as the Kohistan Magmatic Arc some 30 million years ago. It is the least explored magmatic arc in the world. Most of the world magmatic arcs are the sources of gold and copper deposits, e.g. Pan African Nubian Shield.

Historically the place has been home to many Buddhist hermits, as well as a small Hindu community. Alexander the Great supposedly fought a battle against the locals there in 326 BC, at the mount Pir Sar (see Aornos).

The name Chakesar evolved from the word Char Hesar that means "four fortresses". Historically this village was the center of the district Shangla and thus was important for both the inhabitants and the invaders. In order to protect this village from invaders the local inhabitants set up four fortresses around this village and this was thus called Char Hesar which later evolved into Chakesar.

The inhabitants of this area belong to Azi Khel, the major Pashtun tribe. Ttribes and sects: Geographically the village is divided into four subunits traditionally called hujras and the sects residing therein are Khan Khel, Malak Khel, Begum Khel, Ghowara Khel, Imnakhel and Baba khel.

A Hindu community consisting of 7 to 8 families is also the part of the village. Locally these people are called Pukhtana which means the leaders in a sense. Pashto, or Pukhto is language of the Pashtuns and also is a code of conduct which is known with same name as Pukhto or sometimes Pukhtunwali. The leading and dominant people in this area and other nearby villages like Puran, Martung etc. were historically responsible for maintaining law and order in the area and hence were called Pukhtana which literally means Pashtoons and the people responsible for implementing the code of conduct "Pukhto".  The descendants of these ancient lords are called Pukhtana. Each sub-tribe or clan in these people carries whole or part of the name of their great-grandfather normally followed by Khel which means tribe. About 5,000 out of total population of 75,000 people are "Pukhtana" in Chakesar.

Surrounding Chakesar are many mountains and valley. The weather in the region is moderate in summer and cold in winter. The mercury goes a few degrees below the freezing point in December, January and February. People mainly burn wood for their household cooking and warming their houses. Rapid deforestation is thus a problem of this area right now and will be a great issue in the near future.

Chakesar is rich in water and has many springs and small rivers (called Khowar in the local language) which have plenty of water throughout the year.  People grow wheat, maize and rice as their major crops. Agriculture mainly depends upon rains and luckily Chakesar gets good annual precipitation including a rich monsoon season in July and August.

Chakesar was connected to the national grid and digital telephone network in late 1990s.

References

 Chakesar tehsil population
Conservation assessment of plant resources of Chakesar valley Pak. J. Bot., 44: 179–186, Special Issue May 2012.
Chakesur 2011 census

External links
Information on Viovio.
/Photo/

Cities and towns in Shangla District